Lorenzo Gaetano Zavateri (8 September 1690 – 1764) was an Italian baroque violinist and composer.

Zavateri was born in Bologna, where he studied composition and the violin. He was elected to Bologna's famous Accademia Filarmonica in 1717. During the 1720s he joined the esteemed orchestra of San Petronio.  His compositions start to show the galante style of the late baroque and early classical eras.

Works, editions and recordings
 Zavateri Concerti da chiesa e da camera Freiburg Baroque Orchestra dir. Gottfried von der Goltz. DHM.

References

1690 births
1764 deaths
Italian Baroque composers
18th-century Italian composers
Italian male composers
Italian violinists
Male violinists
Musicians from Bologna